Euphorbia stygiana (Portuguese: Trovisco-macho) is a species of evergreen shrub in the family Euphorbiaceae, endemic to several islands of the Azores. It has a critically endangered subspecies (subsp. santamariae) with only 20 known remaining mature individuals in the wild.

Description
Euphorbia stygiana is an evergreen shrub with low but robust serpentine, green stems; white-veined, thick, leathery blue-dark green leaves and large yellow-green flower heads which are strongly honey-scented in spring and summer (from May to June).

During cold winters (especially outside its native range) these leaves may turn to a brilliant crimson colour.

Distribution and habitat

Subspecies

There are two known subspecies: 

The remaining population rests in a steep slope of a valley embedded in a stream, in a humid forest dominated by Pittosporum undulatum. It is a smaller tree, and has a strong apical dominance. Foliage is less leathery with a faint bluish bloom. It also has a less pronounced leaf vein and has fuzzy inflorescences with orange extrafloral nectaries.

subsp. stygiana – the most common subspecies, inhabiting most of the Azorean islands except Graciosa and Santa Maria in high altitude, humid laurel-Juniperus forests.

Threats
The species is mainly threatened by agricultural development, change in land use, and invasive species and the subsequent increase in competition.

Toxicity
Like other members of the Euphorbia genus, E. stygiana has a milky white sap that may cause skin irritation or allergic reaction when in contact with the skin or eye. It is toxic if eaten.

Gallery

References

External links

 Hooker's J. Bot. Kew Gard. Misc. 3: 605 1844.
 The Plant List entry
 Plant Database entry

stygiana
Endemic flora of the Azores